City Harvest may refer to:

City Harvest, a Chicago Family Harvest Church ministry
City Harvest (United Kingdom), a London-based food charity
City Harvest (United States), a New York food rescue organization
City Harvest Church, Singapore